Mike Bennett is a visual artist based in Portland, Oregon, United States. He studied art education and has worked as a preschool teacher.

Bennett's A to Zoo and A, B, Sea projects were exhibited at Director Park. Bioluminescent Beasts was displayed at Pioneer Place in 2022 as part of the Portland Winter Light Festival. Dinolandia was exhibited in downtown Portland in 2022. 

Bennett was recognized as a distinguished alumni of his high school for his work in the visual arts.

References

External links

 

Year of birth missing (living people)
Living people
Artists from Portland, Oregon